Jason Mansfield Johnson (born November 8, 1965) is a former American football wide receiver who played three seasons in the National Football League with the Denver Broncos, Pittsburgh Steelers and New Orleans Saints. He played college football at Illinois State University and attended West Side High School in Gary, Indiana. He was also a member of the Frankfurt Galaxy of the World League of American Football.

Personal life
He coached his son, Jon'Vea Johnson, in high school at West Side Leadership Academy. His son went on to play college football at the University of Toledo and was signed by the Dallas Cowboys as an undrafted free agent after the 2019 NFL Draft on April 30, 2019.

References

External links
Just Sports Stats
Fanbase profile

Living people
1965 births
Players of American football from Gary, Indiana
American football wide receivers
African-American players of American football
Illinois State Redbirds football players
Denver Broncos players
Pittsburgh Steelers players
New Orleans Saints players
Frankfurt Galaxy players
21st-century African-American people
20th-century African-American sportspeople